was an mid-Edo period Japanese samurai, and the 8th daimyō of Fukui Domain He was famed as a lover of sumo.

Biography
Yoshikuni was born in Edo in 1681 as the sixth son of Matsudaira Masakatsu of Echizen-Matsuoka Domain and his mother was a concubine. HIs name in infancy was Katsuchiyo (勝千代), later becoming Matsudaira Masanao (昌尚).  In 1701, when his uncle Matsudaira Masachika selected him has heir to Fukui Domain, he took the name of Matsudaira Masakuni (昌邦), and after his adoptive father Masachika was granted a formal audience by Shōgun Tokugawa Ietsuna and had his name changed to Yoshinori, he followed suit, becoming Matsudaira Yoshikuni. At that time, he  was granted Senior Fifth Rank, Lower Grade Court rank and the courtesy title of Ōi-no-kami

He became daimyō in 1710 on his father's retirement. In 1714, he was granted the courtesy title of Sakon'e-gon-shōjō.

In his tenure, he attempted to rebuilt the domain's finances, and stressed public works projects in emulation of Tokugawa Yoshimune, whom he greatly admired. He dismissed a number of incompetent officials and corrupt magistrates, including the domain's Kanjō-bugyō, and proved to be a popular ruler. In return, Tokugawa Yoshimune ordered that all of the tenryō territory in Echizen be administered by Fukui Domain. This effectively added 100,000 koku to the domain's kokudaka. He also completed a comprehensive historical survey of Echizen Province, listing 330 ruins of castles and fortified manors.

In 1714, he invited military strategist Daidōji Yūzan to Fukui Domain. He died in 1722, without male heir and was succeeded by his brother Matsudaira Munemasa. His graves are at the temple of Unshō-ji in Fukui, and the clan temple of Kaian-ji in Shinagawa, Tokyo.

Family
 Father: Matsudaira Masakatsu (1636–1693)
 Mother: Akiyama-dono
 Adoptive father: Matsudaira Yoshinori
 Wife: daughter of kuge Hino Yoshikuni
 Concubine: Itsuji-dono
 Daughter: Katsuhime, married Matsudaira Munenori

References
Papinot, Edmond. (1948). Historical and Geographical Dictionary of Japan. New York: Overbeck Co.

External links
 Fukui Domain on "Edo 300 HTML" (3 November 2007) 
  越前松平氏 (Echizen Matsudaira) at ReichsArchiv.jp

Notes

1681 births
1722 deaths
Shinpan daimyo
Fukui-Matsudaira clan
People of Edo-period Japan